The Céide Fields is an archaeological site on the north County Mayo coast in the west of Ireland, about  northwest of Ballycastle. The site has been described as the most extensive Neolithic site in Ireland and is claimed to contain the oldest known field systems globally. Using various dating methods, it has been stated that the creation and development of the Céide Fields went back approximately 5500 years (~3500 BCE), some 2,500 years before this type of field system developed everywhere else in Europe. Other dating methods and research has suggested that the complex developed 3,000 years ago, and is otherwise a "textbook example" of a Celtic field system, several examples of which are associated with late Bronze Age and Iron Age Europe.

The site is in UNESCO's tentative list to gain World Heritage status.

History
The discovery of the Céide Fields originally began in the 1930s when a schoolteacher, Patrick Caulfield, noticed linear piles of rocks which were uncovered as he cut away some peat for fuel. Caulfield noted that the rocks must have been placed there by people, because their configuration was apparently unnatural and deliberate. The rocks were also positioned beneath the bog, which suggested they were there before the bog developed, implying a very ancient origin.

The unravelling of the significance of this discovery did not begin for another forty years when Patrick's son, Seamus, having studied archaeology, began to investigate further. Investigations revealed a complex of fields, houses and megalithic tombs concealed by the growth of blanket bogs over the course of many centuries.

While research by Caulfield and other archaeologists has dated the Céide Fields complex to the Neolithic (Stone Age) period, other research has questioned this conclusion and suggested a later (Bronze Age) date.

Research and preservation

In order to preserve the site and ensure the continuation of research, a simple method was used to explore the sub-bog walls. This involved the location and mapping of these hidden walls by probing with long T-shaped iron rods. (These were locally available as they were traditionally used to probe for prehistoric fallen timber below the bog.) The ensuing excavation of habitation sites and tombs revealed the way of life of people living 200 generations earlier. They were a community of farmers who cleared large areas of forest for use as farm land. Their main economy was cattle rearing but among them were also craftspeople and builders in both wood and stone.

It was discovered that these people arrived in a land with substantial forest cover. This was cleared to provide access to arable land and to provide building material and firewood. Palaeoecological research published in 1995 and 2001 indicated that the woodland cleared by the farmers was primarily pine and birch, and was cleared to create pasture for livestock. This clearance continued onward and outward away from the area in continuing procurement of firewood. 

The climate at the time was much warmer, leading to almost year-round growth potential. Samples taken from the remains of trees found in the bog provided evidence of this.

For a while, these people prospered, but some changes led to the development of raised bogs and the transformation of the arable land into barren and unusable land. An ironpan has developed in the subsoil over the area of the Céide Fields.

See also
Lynchet
Kilcommon

References

External links

 Céide Fields web site
 Céide Fields at Heritage Ireland

4th-millennium BC architecture
Geography of County Mayo
Former populated places in Ireland
Museums in County Mayo
Archaeological museums in the Republic of Ireland
Archaeological sites in County Mayo